My Lady Robin Hood is a 1919 American silent Western film directed by Jay Hunt and starring Texas Guinan.

Cast
 Texas Guinan

References

External links
 

1919 films
1919 Western (genre) films
1919 short films
American black-and-white films
American silent short films
Silent American Western (genre) films
Films directed by Jay Hunt
1910s American films